Boston College (BC) is a private Jesuit research university in Chestnut Hill, Massachusetts. Founded in 1863, the university has more than 9,300 full-time undergraduates and nearly 5,000 graduate students. Although Boston College is classified as an R1 research university, it still uses the word "college" in its name to reflect its historical position as a small liberal arts college. Its main campus is a historic district and features some of the earliest examples of collegiate gothic architecture in North America. In accordance with its Jesuit heritage, the university offers a liberal arts curriculum with a distinct emphasis on formative education and service to others.

Undergraduate admission is highly selective. The university offers bachelor's degrees, master's degrees, and doctoral degrees through its eight colleges and schools: Morrissey College of Arts & Sciences, Carroll School of Management, Lynch School of Education and Human Development, Connell School of Nursing, Graduate School of Social Work, Boston College Law School, Boston College School of Theology and Ministry, Woods College of Advancing Studies.

Boston College athletic teams are the Eagles. Their colors are maroon and gold and their mascot is Baldwin the Eagle. The Eagles compete in NCAA Division I as members of the Atlantic Coast Conference in all sports offered by the ACC. The men's and women's ice hockey teams compete in Hockey East. Boston College's men's ice hockey team has won five national championships.

Alumni and affiliates of the university include governors, ambassadors, members of Congress, scholars, writers, medical researchers, Hollywood actors, and professional athletes. Boston College has graduated 3 Rhodes, 22 Truman, and more than 171 Fulbright scholars. Other notable alumni include a U.S. Speaker of the House, a U.S. Secretary of State, and chief executives of Fortune 500 companies.

History

Early history

In 1825, Benedict Joseph Fenwick, S.J., a Jesuit from Maryland, became the second bishop of Boston. He was the first to articulate a vision for a "College in the City of Boston" that would raise a new generation of leaders to serve both the civic and spiritual needs of his fledgling diocese. In 1827, Bishop Fenwick opened a school in the basement of his cathedral and took to the personal instruction of the city's youth. His efforts to attract other Jesuits to the faculty were hampered both by Boston's distance from the center of Jesuit activity in Maryland and by suspicion on the part of the city's Protestant elite. Meanwhile, the vision for a college in Boston was sustained by John McElroy, S.J., who saw an even greater need for such an institution in light of Boston's growing Irish Catholic immigrant population. With the approval of his Jesuit superiors, McElroy went about raising funds and in 1857 purchased land for "The Boston College" on Harrison Avenue in the Hudson neighborhood of South End, Boston, Massachusetts. With little fanfare, the college's two buildings—a schoolhouse and a church—welcomed their first class of scholastics in 1859. Two years later, with as little fanfare, BC closed again. Its short-lived second incarnation was plagued by the outbreak of Civil War and disagreement within the Society over the college's governance and finances. BC's inability to obtain a charter from the anti-Catholic Massachusetts legislature only compounded its troubles.

On , more than three decades after its initial inception, Boston College's charter was formally approved by the Commonwealth of Massachusetts. BC became the second Jesuit institution of higher learning in Massachusetts and the first located in the Boston area. Johannes Bapst, S.J., a Swiss Jesuit from French-speaking Fribourg, was selected as BC's first president and immediately reopened the original college buildings on Harrison Avenue. For most of the 19th century, BC offered a singular 7-year program corresponding to both high school and college. Its entering class in the fall of 1864 included 22 students, ranging in age from 11 to 16 years. The curriculum was based on the Jesuit Ratio Studiorum, emphasizing Latin, Greek, philosophy, and theology.

Move to Chestnut Hill
Boston College's enrollment reached nearly 500 by the turn of the 20th century. Expansion of the South End buildings onto James Street enabled increased separation between the high school and college divisions, though Boston College High School remained a constituent part of Boston College until 1927, when it was separately incorporated. In 1907, newly installed President Thomas I. Gasson, S.J., determined that BC's cramped, urban quarters in Boston's South End were inadequate and unsuited for significant expansion. Inspired by John Winthrop's early vision of Boston as a "city upon a hill", he re-imagined Boston College as world-renowned university and a beacon of Jesuit scholarship. Less than a year after taking office, he purchased Amos Adams Lawrence's farm on Chestnut Hill, six miles (10 km) west of downtown. He organized an international competition for the design of a campus master plan and set about raising funds for the construction of the "new" university. Construction began in 1909.

By 1913, construction costs had surpassed available funds, and as a result Gasson Hall, "New BC's" main building, stood alone on Chestnut Hill for its first three years. Buildings of the former Lawrence farm, including a barn and gatehouse, were temporarily adapted for college use while a massive fundraising effort was underway. While Maginnis's ambitious plans were never fully realized, BC's first "capital campaign"—which included a large replica of Gasson Hall's clock tower set up on Boston Common to measure the fundraising progress—ensured that President Gasson's vision survived. By the 1920s BC began to fill out the dimensions of its university charter, establishing the Boston College Graduate School of Arts & Sciences, the Boston College Law School, and the Woods College of Advancing Studies, followed successively by the Boston College Graduate School of Social Work, the Carroll School of Management, the Connell School of Nursing, and the Lynch School of Education and Human Development. In 1926, Boston College conferred its first degrees on women (though it did not become fully coeducational until 1970). On April 20, 1963, an address by President John F. Kennedy, the nation's first Catholic president who had received an honorary degree in 1956, was the highlight of a week-long centennial celebration. With the rising prominence of its graduates, Boston College and its powerful Alumni Association had established themselves among the city's leading institutions. At the city, state and federal levels, BC graduates dominated Massachusetts politics for much of the 20th century. However, cultural changes in American society and in the church following the Second Vatican Council forced the university to question its purpose and mission. Meanwhile, poor financial management lead to deteriorating facilities and resources, and rising tuition costs. Student outrage, combined with growing protests over Vietnam and the bombings in Cambodia, culminated in student strikes, including demonstrations at Gasson Hall in April 1970.

The Monan era
By the time J. Donald Monan, S.J. began his presidency on September 5, 1972, BC was approximately $30 million in debt, its endowment totaled just under $6 million, and faculty and staff salaries had been frozen during the previous year. Rumors about the university's future were rampant, including speculation that BC would be acquired by Harvard University. After Monan's appointment, the Boston College Board of Trustees was reconfigured.  The board was broadened beyond its historic membership of members of the Society of Jesus, as lay alumni and business leaders were brought in, bringing new business models and an ability to raise funds. A similar restructuring had been accomplished first at the University of Notre Dame in 1967 by Fr. Theodore Hesburgh, CSC, and Edmund Stephan, with many other Catholic colleges following suit in the ensuing years. In 1974, Newton College of the Sacred Heart was merged into BC, allowing expansion of Boston College to the Newton College  campus.  Boston College Law School moved to the campus, and its dormitories provided needed housing for a student population that was increasingly residential, for which the school had to lease off-campus apartments and even motel rooms. Monan was credited with turning around the school's financial position, leading to an improved reputation and increasing attention from around the world. In 1996, Monan's 24-year presidency came to an end when he was named University Chancellor and succeeded by President William P. Leahy, S.J.

Recent history

Since assuming the Boston College presidency, Leahy's tenure has been marked with an acceleration of the growth and development initiated by his predecessor, as well as by what some critics see as abandonment of the college's initial mission to provide a college education for residents of Boston.  It has expanded by almost , while dramatically reducing the greenery of its middle campus, although portions of the college's legendary "Dustbowl" were removed to accommodate additional expansion of its buildings. During this period, undergraduate applications have surpassed 31,000. At the same time, BC students, faculty and athletic teams have seen indicators of success—winning record numbers of Fulbrights, Rhodes, and other academic awards; setting new marks for research grants; and winning conference and national titles. In 2002, Leahy initiated the Church in the 21st Century program to examine issues facing the Catholic Church in light of the clergy sexual abuse scandal. His effort brought BC worldwide praise and recognition for "leading the way on Church reform." Recent plans to merge with the Weston Jesuit School of Theology were followed by an article in The New York Times claiming "such a merger would further Boston College's quest to become the nation's Catholic intellectual powerhouse" and that, once approved by the Vatican and Jesuit authorities in Rome, BC "would become the center for the study of Roman Catholic theology in the United States." On February 16, 2006, the merger was authorized by the Jesuit Conference.

In 2003, after years of student-led discussions and efforts, and administrators' repeated rejection of pleas from students, the school approved a Gay-Straight Alliance, the first university-funded gay support group on campus. In 2004, between 1,000 and 1,200 students rallied behind a student-led campaign to expand the school's non-discrimination statement to include equal protection for gays and lesbians. Earlier that year 84% of the student body voted in favor of a student referendum calling for a change in policy. After several months of discussion the university changed its statement of nondiscrimination to make it more welcoming to gay students in May 2005, but stopped short of prohibiting discrimination on the basis of sexual orientation.

On December 5, 2007, Boston College announced a master plan, a $1.6 billion, 10-year plan to revamp the campus and hire new faculty. The plan includes over $700 million for new buildings and renovations of the campus, including construction of four new academic buildings, a sharp reduction in the size of the legendary "dustbowl" campus green, a  recreation center to replace the Flynn Recreation Complex, a  university center to replace McElroy Commons (which is slated for destruction), and the creation of 610 beds for student housing, as well as many other constructions and renovations. The plan has been criticized by Boston city officials. On February 21, 2008, Boston Mayor Thomas M. Menino warned the school to construct new dormitory building on its main campus, rather than on property acquired from the Archdiocese of Boston. The school was long an institution that targeted commuter students from the Boston area, however in the school's pursuit of a national legacy, that function has been forgotten as the number of commuter students enrolled dropped from well over 50% to a mere three students, according to statistics published by the alumni magazine.

On June 10, 2009, Mayor Menino and Boston's zoning commission approved the Boston College Master Plan, signaling an end to the long approval process, while allowing the school to enter design and planning phases.

On October 18, 2017, hundreds of students walked out of class in a protest against racism and to demand the college officials pay more attention to the school's racial climate. The walk out was sparked by the defacing of two Black Lives Matter posters and an offensive photo was circulated on social media sites. On December 8, 2018, walls, furniture, and a bathroom in the Welch Hall were vandalized with racist, anti-black graffiti. Also, over the previous months, pro-refugee and Black Lives Matter signs were repeatedly removed around campus.

Campus

Chestnut Hill main campus

A "Boston College" streetcar station on Boston's MBTA public transit system, is located at St. Ignatius Gate; it is the western terminus of the Massachusetts Bay Transportation Authority (MBTA) Green Line's B branch (also known as the "Boston College" line) and connects the school to Boston's city center and to other destinations in the city. Due largely to its location and presence of buildings featuring gothic towers reaching into the sky, the Boston College campus is known generally as the "Heights" and to some as the "Crowned Hilltop". The main campus is also listed on the National Register of Historic Places.

Designed by Charles Donagh Maginnis and his firm Maginnis & Walsh in 1908, the Boston College campus is a seminal example of Collegiate Gothic architecture. Combining Gothic Revival architecture with principles of Beaux-Arts planning, Maginnis proposed a vast complex of academic buildings set in a cruciform plan. Maginnis's design broke from the traditional Oxbridge models that had inspired it—and that had until then characterized Gothic architecture on American campuses. In its unprecedented scale, Gasson Tower was conceived not as the belfry of a singular building, but as the crowning campanile of Maginnis' new "city upon a hill". Although Maginnis' ambitious Gothic project never saw full completion, its central portion was built according to plan and forms the core of what is now BC's iconic middle campus. Among these, the Bapst Library has been called the "finest example of Collegiate Gothic architecture in America" and Devlin Hall won the Harleston Parker Medal for "most beautiful building in Boston". The 1895 Louis K. Liggett Estate was acquired in 1941 and developed into a Tudor-style upper campus, while an architecturally eclectic lower campus took shape on land acquired by filling in part of the Chestnut Hill Reservoir. Modernism had an enormous impact on development after the 1940s, though some of the modernist buildings at BC maintained non-modern rough stone facades in keeping with Maginnis's original designs.

Boston College's eight research libraries contain over two million printed volumes. Including manuscripts, journals, government documents and microform items, ranging from ancient papyrus scrolls to digital databases, the collections have some twelve million items. Together with the university's museums, they include original manuscripts and prints by Galileo, Ignatius of Loyola, and Francis Xavier as well as world-renowned collections in Jesuitana, Irish literature, sixteenth-century Flemish tapestries, ancient Greek pottery, Caribbean folk art and literature, Japanese prints, U.S. government documents, Congressional Archives, and paintings that span the history of art from Europe, Asia, and the Americas. Opened in 1928, Bapst Library was named for the first president of Boston College (Johannes Bapst, S.J., 1815 to 1887) and it was one of the few structures built according to Charles Donagh Maginnis' original "Oxford in America" master plan. Bapst served as the university's main library until 1984. A guide to the building's stained glass windows is available online. The Burns Library of Rare Books and Special Collections is home to more than 150,000 volumes, some 15 million manuscripts and other important works, including a world-renowned collection of Irish literature. A rare facsimile of the Book of Kells is on public display in the library's Irish Room, and each day one page of the illuminated manuscript is turned. It also houses the papers of prominent Boston College alumni. The library is named after the Honorable John. J. Burns (1901 to 1957), Massachusetts Superior Court Justice and a member of the Boston College Class of 1921.

There are a variety of student housing options for students on campus. Those located on lower campus are Walsh, Rubenstein, Ignacio, 90 St. Thomas More Road, 66 Commonwealth Ave, Vanderslice, Gabelli, Voute, Stayer, and 'The Mods'. Roncalli, Welch, and Williams Halls are located on the middle campus on College Road. Freshman housing on Upper Campus includes Kostka, Gonzaga, Fitzpatrick, Medeiros, Cheverus, Claver, Loyola, Xavier, Fenwick, and Shaw House. Additional freshman housing is on the Newton Campus and includes Cushing, Duchesne (East and West), Hardey, and Keyes (North and South).

In the fall of 2010, Boston College began construction of Stokes Hall, a  academic building on what was formerly known as the Dustbowl. Stokes Hall is the first academic building to be constructed on the Middle Campus since 2001. It was completed in December 2012, and opened for use in January 2013. In 2014, the university reconstructed St. Mary's Hall and renovated indoor pieces of Carney Hall. More Hall had been demolished to make way for a new residence hall in July 2014, slated to open sometime in 2016.

Middle Campus

 Carney Faculty Center
Located on middle campus, Carney Faculty Center no longer hosts classes and is largely office space. Rather, the building houses the offices of the Army ROTC program as well as the Student Program Offices. Often known as 'dark and dank', the building is distinct from the quadrangle area located across the campus green, known as the Dustbowl. Built in 1963, Carney has an unusual structure seeming to face away from the rest of the campus. Contrary to popular belief, the building was not built backwards but rather styled to allow more offices to have windows, according to BC Historian, Professor Thomas O'Connor. The Beacon Street side of the building contains a fountain in the middle of the courtyard; the fountain has been dry for decades as the result of the frequent use of powdered soap pranks by undergraduate students. The building additionally contains sets of unused lockers throughout the floors, which added to the fictitious speculation of the building being a former high school although they had been used by the commuter students who formed the vast majority of enrollment for many years. The existing 10-year university plan slates Carney Hall for reconstruction. Sections of the first floor have received new carpets, fresh coats of paint, and new ceiling tiles. The existing university 30–50-year plan schedules the reconstructed building to remain part of the quadrangle.

 McElroy Commons
Located on the Southwest Corner of middle campus, McElroy is referred to by students as 'Mac', reflecting the common, but incorrect, pronunciation of the building's name. McElroy Commons holds a variety of offices and contains Carney's Dining Hall which serves the majority of students living on College Road and Upper Campus. Eagle's Nest, a lunch spot is located on the second floor of the building. The first floor of the building was updated in the summer of 2013.
 Stokes Hall
 Fulton Hall
 McGuinn Hall
 Devlin Hall
 Lyons Hall
 Gasson Hall
 St. Mary's Hall
 Bapst Library

One of the most iconic images of Boston College lies within Gargan Hall of Bapst Library. Gargan Hall is a widely popular study location for students, open 24 hours on most days and known as the quietest place on campus. Gargan Hall regularly finds itself in the top 10 of the world's most beautiful libraries. While for years the hall contained a red rug, the hall now is carpeted in emerald green. This art library contains over 51,000 volumes, 150 serial titles, and access to hundreds of journal databases and electronic journals in Art, Architecture, Museum Studies and Photography. The library maintains print and electronic reserves for courses in the Fine Arts.
 O'Neill Library
 Cushing Hall
 Campion Hall
 Merkert Hall
 Higgins Hall
 Maloney Hall

Newton Campus 
The campus is home to the law school, Stuart Dining Hall, Trinity Chapel, and residential housing for roughly 40% of the freshman class. Freshman dormitories on Newton Campus include Hardey, Cushing, Duchesne, and Keyes. Two athletic fields and a recreation center are also located on the campus. A new building opened in 1996 housing the Law Library for the Boston College Law School in Newton.

Brighton Campus
Between 2004 and 2007, Boston College acquired  of land from the Archdiocese of Boston. This included the archdiocese's former headquarters, sold to the university in 2004 for $107,400,000.

The grounds are named after Brighton, the Boston neighborhood in which it is located, as the municipal border sits on the street intersection where the two properties meet.  It is adjacent to the main campus (on the opposite side of Commonwealth Avenue), and includes the Italian Renaissance-style historic mansion of the Cardinal's residence. The mansion now houses the McMullen Museum of Art, which has a prominent permanent collection and organizes exhibits from all periods and cultures of art history. Recent exhibits and acquisitions include works by Edvard Munch, Amedeo Modigliani, Frank Stella, Françoise Gilot, John LaFarge, and Jackson Pollock. However, outshining by far all McMullen exhibitions, previous and subsequent, in terms of international media attention and attendance numbers was the 1999 exhibition, "Saints and Sinners: Caravaggio and the Baroque Image," featuring as its centerpiece the first North American appearance of the then-recently rediscovered masterpiece by Italian Baroque artist Caravaggio, The Taking of Christ.  Admission to the museum is free and open to the general public. In 2008, the Weston Jesuit School of Theology merged with Boston College, and the new School of Theology and Ministry moved to Brighton. In addition to other offices and facilities, the Brighton campus is home to the Harrington Athletics Village.

Other properties in Chestnut Hill 
In 2017, the university purchased the 24-acre Mishkan Tefila Synagogue property in Chestnut Hill. When purchased, the property was only used for administrative services and event parking. The former synagogue's 806-seat auditorium has since been opened as a new rehearsal and event venue for Boston College's Robsham Theater Arts Center. It is currently the largest venue for theater at the university. Additionally, the building houses a large, ballroom-style, multi-purpose room and a hexagon-shaped meeting room for performances, events, and conferences. An outdoor quad is also available to be used for events and the performing arts.

Approximately 17 wooded acres of the property, however, have been taken by the City of Newton under the power of eminent domain in December 2019.

In 2020, Boston College bought Pine Manor College, a small liberal arts college in Chestnut Hill with a high amount of first generation college students and inner city students that was undergoing financial struggles.

Other properties 
The university owns and maintains a number of other properties around Massachusetts and the Republic of Ireland.

 Connors Center: an  retreat center in Dover, Massachusetts.
 Weston Observatory:  a  seismology research observatory and field station in Weston, Massachusetts.
 Boston College Ireland: home to the Centre for Irish Programmes: Dublin on St. Stephen's Green in Dublin, Ireland.
 Bellarmine House: an  Jesuit Villa House in Cohasset, Massachusetts, maintained by the Jesuits Community at BC and used for religious retreats.

Organization and administration

Its annual operating budget is approximately $667 million. The most recent and ongoing fundraising campaign, dubbed "Light the World", was announced on October 11, 2008. The seven-year campaign aims to raise $1.5 billion in honor of the 150th anniversary of the college. Funds raised will be used to support the strategic priorities of the university, including academic programs, financial aid, Jesuit Catholic identity, athletics, student programming, and capital construction projects.

Catholic and Jesuit

The 112 Jesuits living on the Boston College campus make up one of the largest Jesuit communities in the world and include members of the faculty and administration, graduate students, and visiting international scholars.

The chapel for the university is located in St. Mary's Hall, the Jesuit residential facility. Additional BC chapels are Trinity Chapel on the Newton Campus, St. Joseph's Chapel in the Basement of Gonzaga Hall on Upper Campus, Simboli Hall Chapel on the Brighton Campus, and St. Catherine of Sienna Chapel in Cushing Hall. Over 70 Catholic Masses are celebrated on Campus each week during the Academic Year. The college also maintains close relations with the nearby Church of Saint Ignatius of Loyola. The church is named after the founder of the Jesuit order, Ignatius of Loyola. It is run independently of the Archdiocese and is staffed by the Jesuits. Although not technically the university's church, Boston College provides the parish with Internet access, e-mail service, telephone and voice mail service, parking, and dormitory space for the religious education program. Each year, several Boston College students teach in the religious education program. Jesuit priests from Boston College occasionally preside at the church's liturgies. St. Ignatius provides a spiritual home for many students during their time at Boston College and has also hosted alumni weddings. The church building is also used by the college for some of their larger religious events.

Affiliated institutions
St. Columbkille Parish is a Catholic Church and elementary school in Brighton, Massachusetts that has an alliance with BC. Under the agreement, the parish school is to be governed by a board of members and a board of trustees comprising representatives from the Archdiocese of Boston, Boston College, St. Columbkille Parish and the greater Boston community. The board of trustees will authorize an audit of the school's curriculum, faculty, finances, and facilities before creating a strategic plan to guide the school in the future. Lynch School of Education and Human Development faculty will work directly with the school's teachers on faculty and curriculum development, presenting new approaches to education and working to establish best practices in the classroom. The agreement, announced in March 2006 by University President William P. Leahy, S.J., and Boston Cardinal Sean O'Malley, OFM Cap., is believed to represent the first such collaboration between a Catholic university and a parochial school in the United States.

Admissions

For the Class of 2025, Boston College received 39,875 applications, of which it admitted 18.9%. The interquartile (middle 50%) of admitted students of the class of 2025 who submitted test scores under Boston College's test-optional policy possessed scores between 1460 and 1540 on the SAT and 33–35 on the ACT. The accepted class includes students from 50 states, 3 U.S. territories, and 75 foreign countries.

Academics

Schools and colleges

As a research university, Boston College is made up of a total of eight constituent colleges and schools:
 Morrissey College of Arts & Sciences
 Carroll School of Management
 Lynch School of Education and Human Development
 Connell School of Nursing
 Boston College School of Social Work
 Boston College Law School
 Boston College School of Theology and Ministry
 Woods College of Advancing Studies

Rankings

Boston College tied for 35th among national universities and tied for 468th among global universities in U.S. News & World Report "America's Best Colleges 2021" rankings and 41st in the Forbes 2019 edition of "America's Top Colleges", In 2016, the undergraduate school of business, the Carroll School of Management, placed 3rd in an annual ranking of U.S. undergraduate business schools by Bloomberg Businessweek. A 2007 Princeton Review survey of parents that asked "What 'dream college' would you most like to see your child attend were prospects of acceptance or cost not issues?" placed BC 6th. Boston College is accredited by the New England Commission of Higher Education.

Gabelli Presidential Scholars Program
The Gabelli Presidential Scholars Program is a competitive undergraduate program offered to a subset of applicants to Boston College. This program offers a four-year, full-tuition scholarship to Boston College. Students who accept an invitation to apply for the program are asked to spend a weekend at Boston College, where they complete several interviews and participate in a mock classroom seminar. The Gabelli Presidential Scholars Program is very competitive; out of the Boston College applicants invited to apply to the GPSP program, approximately 18 are awarded the scholarship. Since the entire early application pool is evaluated in determining whom to grant application invitations to, the overall admissions rate of the program is less than 1%. The scholarship includes a number of funded enrichment opportunities such as several summer programs, among them a summer-long international study program for language proficiency. Many Gabelli Presidential Scholars have been recognized for academic excellence through prestigious awards including Rhodes, Truman, and Churchill Scholarships along with numerous Fulbright grants.

Order of the Cross and Crown
The Order of the Cross and Crown, founded in 1939, is the College of Arts and Sciences honor society for seniors who have achieved an average of at least A−, as well as established records of unusual service and leadership on the campus. The selections committee, composed of the deans, faculty members, and administration, appoints specially distinguished members of the Order to be its officers as Chief Marshal and Marshals. Induction into the Cross and Crown Honor Society is one of the highest and most prestigious honors that BC students can receive. Campbell Soup Company CEO, Denise Morrison is an example of one prominent member.

Research

Scholarly publications
 Boston College Environmental Affairs Law Review
 Boston College Law Review
 C21 Resources, a progressive journal of contemporary Catholic issues, published by BC's Church in the 21st Century Center.
 Dianoia: The Undergraduate Philosophy Journal of Boston College, a journal featuring undergraduate work in philosophy from around the world.
 The Eagletarian, published by The BC Economics Association.
 Guide to Jesuit Education
 International & Comparative Law Review
 Journal of Technology, Learning and Assessment
 Lumen et Vita: The Graduate Academic Journal of the Boston College School of Theology and Ministry,
 New Arcadia Review
 Religion and the Arts Journal
 Studies in Christian-Jewish Relations, the official journal of the Council of Centers of Jewish-Christian Relations (CCJR) and is published by the Center for Christian-Jewish Learning at Boston College and the Boston College Libraries.
 Teaching Exceptional Children / Teaching Exceptional Children Plus
 Third World Law Journal
 Uniform Commercial Code Reporter-Digest

Philosophy

Philosophy has long been an important part of the university's curriculum. In the seventies, Boston College's Philosophy Department distinguished itself from the majority of American Departments by promoting the study of Continental European philosophy over and above analytic philosophy. Under the direction of Department Chair Joseph Flanagan, SJ and following the example of Fordham University, the department branched out from its traditional strengths in philosophy of religion, ancient/medieval philosophy, and Thomism. It has since become a leading university in the United States for the study of continental philosophy. As of 2021, Boston College ranks 39th in the world, and 13th in the United States, for philosophy according to the QS World University Rankings.

The department has featured as permanent faculty a number of noted continental philosophers including Heidegger scholar William J. Richardson, SJ as well as experts in phenomenology Richard Cobb-Stevens and Jacques Taminiaux. The department today still has a large proportion of experts in continental philosophy including European philosophy and literature expert Richard Kearney, expert in phenomenology John Sallis, expert in Christian philosophy and apologetics Peter Kreeft, and experts in social and political philosophy David M. Rasmussen and James Bernauer, SJ. Since the seventies, the department has also had a number of notable visiting professors including Hans-Georg Gadamer, Jean-Luc Marion, and Bernard Lonergan, SJ.

Student life

AHANA
AHANA is the term Boston College uses to refer to persons of African-American, Hispanic, Asian, and Native American descent. The term was coined at Boston College in 1979 by two students, Alfred Feliciano and Valerie Lewis, who objected to the name "Office of Minority Programs" used by Boston College at the time. They cited the definition of the word minority as "less than" and proposed, instead, to use the term AHANA which they felt celebrated social cultural differences. After receiving overwhelming approval from the university's board of trustees, and UGBC president Dan Cotter, the Office of Minority Student Programs became the Office of AHANA Student Programs. The term, or one or its derivative forms, such as ALANA (where "Latino" is substituted for "Hispanic"), has become common on a number of other American university campuses. Boston College, which has registered the term AHANA as a trademark, has granted official permission for its use to over 50 institutions and organizations in the United States. Many more use the term unofficially. Other institutions that use the AHANA acronym include Suffolk University, Cleveland State University, Eastern Mennonite University, Saint Martin's University, Le Moyne College, and Salem State University. With some support on campus, there are still racist incidents on campus, such as Black Lives Matter posters being torn down and anti-black vandalism on dorm walls.

Student media
Newspapers
 The Heights, the principal student newspaper, published weekly; established in 1919
 The Gavel, an independent progressive student magazine; launched on October 27, 2009. The Gavel publishes most articles online, but brought back its print edition in the Spring of 2018.
 The Torch, an independent Catholic student newspaper that publishes stories covering Catholic news on campus and around the world as well as student faith reflections.  It was established in 2013.
 The Rock, an independent student online publication recognized by the university. Launched on September 26, 2011
 The New England Classic, a satirical newspaper unrecognized by the university but regularly published and distributed on campus; launched in Fall 2007 and is independently funded.
 Colloquium Political Science Journal, The political science journal of Boston College that is sponsored by the Institute for the Liberal Arts at Boston College.

Broadcasting
 The BC, a widely acclaimed parody of The OC featuring students, Jesuits, and administrators
 Boston College Television (BCTV), a student-run cable television station formerly featuring a show known as Now You Know, but now reports on student life, sports, entertainment, and other subjects
 WZBC, 90.3 FM, the student-run radio station which provides independent and experimental music

Other notable publications
 Sub Turri, the Boston College yearbook, published since 1913
 The Stylus of Boston College, the undergraduate literary magazine, founded in 1882
 Elements Undergraduate Research Journal, the premier undergraduate research journal of Boston College, published biannually
 Al-Noor: The Boston College Undergraduate Middle Eastern and Islamic Studies Journal, one of the only undergraduate Middle Eastern and Islamic Studies Journals in the world.
 Kaleidoscope International Journal, the international relations and global studies journal of Boston College
 Dianoia: The Undergraduate Philosophy Journal of Boston College

Ensembles
 BC bOp", the Boston College jazz band
 Boston College "Screaming Eagles" Marching Band
 Boston College Symphony Orchestra,
 Pep Band, the ensemble that performs at Boston College hockey and basketball games
 University Wind Ensemble of Boston College
 University Symphonic Band
 University Chorale of Boston College
 Madrigal Singers of Boston College

Theater Performance 

 The Dramatics Society
 Contemporary Theater

Alma mater
Alma Mater was written by T.J. Hurley, who also wrote For Boston (the Boston College Fight Song) and was a member of the Class of 1885.

Athletics

Boston College teams are known as the Eagles. They compete as a member of the National Collegiate Athletic Association (NCAA) Division I level (Football Bowl Subdivision (FBS) sub-level for football), primarily competing in the Atlantic Coast Conference (ACC) for all sports since the 2005–06 season. The Eagles formerly competed as a charter member of the Big East Conference from 1979–80 to 2004–05. Up to that point, Boston College was the only Big East member affiliated with the Catholic Church that played football in the conference. All the football-playing members of the Big East are now secular (usually public) institutions. Men's sports include baseball, basketball, cross country, fencing (non-ACC), football, golf, ice hockey (non-ACC), sailing (non-ACC), skiing (non-ACC), soccer, swimming, tennis, and track & field; while women's sports include basketball, cross country, fencing (non-ACC), field hockey, golf, ice hockey (non-ACC), lacrosse, rowing, sailing, skiing, soccer, softball, swimming, tennis, track & field and volleyball. The men's and women's ice hockey teams compete in Hockey East; while the women's rowing team competes in the Eastern Association of Women's Rowing Colleges (EAWRC) as well as the ACC; and the co-ed skiing, fencing and sailing teams are non-ACC/NCAA. Boston College is one of only thirteen universities in the country offering NCAA Division I Football Bowl Subdivision (formerly, I-A) football, Division I men's and women's basketball, and Division I hockey.
 
The mascot for all Boston College athletic teams is the Eagle, generally referred to in the plural, i.e., "The Eagles". The character representing the mascot at football, hockey, and basketball games is an American bald eagle named Baldwin, derived from the "bald" head of the American bald eagle and the word "win". The school colors are maroon and gold. The fight song, For Boston, was composed by T.J. Hurley, class of 1885.

In hockey and baseball, Boston College participates in the annual Beanpot tournaments held at TD Banknorth Garden and Fenway Park, respectively. Boston College competes in the Beanpot against the three other major sports colleges in Boston: the Northeastern University Huskies, Harvard University Crimson, and Boston University Terriers. BC has reached the championship game 31 times and has won the Beanpot 16 times, including the 2010, 2011 and 2012 championships. The less renowned baseball tournament, was first played in 1990 and out of seventeen baseball Beanpots, Boston College has won nine, last winning in 2008. The baseball team also plays an exhibition game against the Boston Red Sox at jetBlue Park after several years at City Of Palms Park both in Ft. Myers, Florida during Major League Baseball's spring training. The men's hockey team won the 2008 NCAA Championship on April 12, 2008, with a 4–1 victory over the University of Notre Dame in Denver, Colorado,  the 2010 NCAA Championship with a 5–0 victory over Wisconsin on April 10, 2010, and in 2012 in the 2012 NCAA Division I Men's Ice Hockey Tournament  with a 4–1 victory over Ferris State University in Tampa.

Principal athletic facilities include Alumni Stadium (capacity: 44,500), Conte Forum (8,606), Kelley Rink (7,884), Eddie Pellagrini Diamond at John Shea Field (1,000), the Newton Soccer Complex (1,000), and the Flynn Recreation Complex. The Yawkey Athletics Center opened in the spring of 2005. BC students compete in 31 varsity sports as well as a number of club and intramural teams. On March 18, 2002, Boston College's Athletics program was named to the College Sports Honor Roll as one of the nation's top 20 programs by U.S. News & World Report.

Boston College athletes are among the most academically successful in the nation, according to the NCAA's Academic Progress Rate (APR). In 2006 Boston College received Public Recognition Awards with fourteen of its sports in the top 10% of the nation academically. The Eagles tied Notre Dame for the highest total of any Division I-A university. Other schools having ten or more sports honored included Navy (12), Stanford (11), and Duke (11). Teams honored were football, men's fencing, men's outdoor track, men's skiing, women's rowing, women's cross country, women's fencing, women's field hockey, women's indoor track, women's outdoor track, women's skiing, women's swimming, women's soccer, women's tennis, and women's volleyball. Boston College's football program was one of only five Division I-A teams that were so honored. The other four were Auburn, Navy, Stanford, and Duke.

Football

The Boston College Eagles have achieved repeated success in college football. On November 16, 1940, BC's Frank Leahy-coached championship team took a win from two-season undefeated Georgetown University in the final seconds, in a game that renowned sportswriter Grantland Rice called the greatest ever played.

Two of Boston College's most famous football victories came in dramatic fashion, on the final play of the game. On November 23, 1984, before a national audience on CBS, Doug Flutie threw a  Hail Mary to Gerard Phelan for a 47–45 victory over the University of Miami at the Orange Bowl. The Eagles finished the 1984 season with a 10–2 record, defeating the University of Houston in the Cotton Bowl. The team completed the season with a #5 rank in the AP poll. Flutie was awarded the Heisman Trophy, the only Eagle to date so honored.  On November 20, 1993, the Eagles beat undefeated archrival Notre Dame 41–39 on a 41-yard field goal by David Gordon as time expired, preventing the Fighting Irish a berth in the national championship game.

In 2007, the Eagles reached the #2 rank in both the AP and Coaches' Poll as well as the BCS rankings, led by Matt Ryan. Ryan was awarded the 2007 Johnny Unitas Golden Arm Award, presented annually to the nation's most outstanding college senior quarterback. He was selected third in the 2008 NFL Draft by the Atlanta Falcons, making him the highest-chosen BC player in NFL Draft history.

The Eagles annually wear red bandanna-themed uniforms in honor of fallen September 11, 2001 hero Welles Crowther, class of 1999. Crowther, who played on BC's lacrosse team, was an equity trader who died saving the lives of at least 10 people during the 2001 terrorist attack on the World Trade Center in New York City. He used a red bandanna that he often carried to keep from breathing in smoke and debris.

Fight Song: "For Boston"

"For Boston" is claimed to be America's oldest college fight song, composed by T. J. Hurley in 1885. It has two verses but the most commonly sung one is the first verse. Boston-based band Dropkick Murphys covered this song on their album Sing Loud, Sing Proud!. Changes have been made to the song, including reworking the phrase "for here men are men" into "for here all are one" in the first verse.

Notable persons

BC students were universally called "Heightsmen" until 1925 when Caitlin Beckman became the first "Heightswoman" to receive a BC degree. "Heightsonian" was originally conceived as a way to gender neutralize the original term "Heightsmen", though "Eagles", once exclusively used for members of the university's athletics teams, is more commonly used. The term "Golden Eagles" refers strictly to BC graduates who have celebrated their 50th anniversary reunion. "Double Eagles" refer to alumni who attended Boston College High School and graduated from the college and "Triple Eagles" are those alumni who are also graduates of a graduate program.

There are over 179,000 alumni in over 120 countries around the world. Boston College students have enjoyed success in winning prestigious post-graduate fellowships and awards, including recent Rhodes, Marshall, Mellon, Fulbright, Truman, Churchill, and Goldwater scholarships, among others. BC's yield rate for Fulbright awards is the highest in the country. In 2007, students in the German department were awarded 13 Fulbright scholarships, five more than the previous highest number from a single department. Although formal numbers are not kept, and the claim cannot be confirmed, the number of award winners from one department to study in a specific country is considered by some scholars to be the highest in the 60-year history of the Fulbright program.

See also
 Hopkins House (Boston College)
 List of Jesuit sites
 List of presidents of Boston College

Notes

References

External links

 
 Boston College Athletics website

 
Association of Catholic Colleges and Universities
Catholic universities and colleges in Massachusetts
1863 establishments in Massachusetts
Educational institutions established in 1863
Gothic Revival architecture in Massachusetts
Jesuit universities and colleges in the United States